This is an incomplete list of astronauts who are resident in any of the countries of Europe, exclusive of the former Soviet republics of Russia, Belarus, and Ukraine.

Alphabetical list
EAC = European Astronaut Corps
  Aleksandar Panayotov Aleksandrov (Intercosmos) — Soyuz TM-5
  Patrick Baudry, second Frenchman in space, born in Douala, Cameroon — STS-51-G
  Ivan Bella, first Slovak in space — Soyuz TM-29/28
  Maurizio Cheli, EAC — STS-75
  Jean-Loup Chrétien, CNES (Intercosmos), first French person in space and first non-Soviet European to walk in space — Soyuz T-6, Soyuz TM-7/6, STS-86
  Jean-François Clervoy, EAC — STS-66, STS-84, STS-103
  Samantha Cristoforetti, EAC — Soyuz TMA-15M (Expedition 42, SpaceX Crew-4 (Expedition 67)
  Frank De Winne, EAC — Soyuz TMA-1/TM-34, Soyuz TMA-15
  Pedro Duque, EAC, first Spaniard in space — STS-95, Soyuz TMA-3/2
  Reinhold Ewald, EAC — Soyuz TM-25/24
  Léopold Eyharts, EAC — Soyuz TM-27/26, STS-122/123
  Bertalan Farkas (Intercosmos), first Hungarian in space — Soyuz 36/35
  Jean-Jacques Favier, born in Kehl, Germany — STS-78
  Klaus-Dietrich Flade — Soyuz TM-14/13
  Dirk Frimout, first Belgian in space — STS-45
  Christer Fuglesang, EAC, first Swede in space — STS-116, STS-128
  Reinhard Furrer, born in Wörgl, Austria (1940–1995) — STS-61-A (flew for West Germany)
  Umberto Guidoni, EAC, first European on the International Space Station — STS-75, STS-100
  Claudie André-Deshays Haigneré, EAC, first Frenchwoman in space (Mir, 1996) — Soyuz TM-24/23,  Soyuz TM-33/32
  Jean-Pierre Haigneré, EAC — Soyuz TM-17/16, Soyuz TM-29
  Mirosław Hermaszewski (Intercosmos), first Pole in space — Soyuz 30
  Georgi Ivanov  (Intercosmos), first Bulgarian in space — Soyuz 33
  Sigmund Jähn (Intercosmos), first German in space — Soyuz 31/29 (flew for East Germany)
  André Kuipers, EAC — Soyuz TMA-4/3
  Franco Malerba, first Italian in space — STS-46
  Matthias Maurer, SpaceX Crew-3
  Ulf Merbold, EAC — STS-9, STS-42, Soyuz TM-20/19 (flew for both West Germany and united Germany)
  Ernst Messerschmid — STS-61-A (flew for West Germany)
  Andreas Mogensen, EAC, first Dane in space — Soyuz TMA-18M 
  Paolo A. Nespoli, EAC — STS-120
  Claude Nicollier, EAC, first Swiss in space — STS-46, STS-61, STS-75, STS-103
  Wubbo Ockels, EAC, first Dutchman in space — STS-61-A
  Luca Parmitano, EAC — Soyuz TMA-09M (Expedition 36)
  Philippe Perrin, EAC, born in Meknes, Morocco — STS-111
  Thomas Pesquet, EAC, — ISS
  Dumitru Prunariu (Intercosmos), first Romanian in space — Soyuz 40
  Thomas Reiter, EAC, first German to walk in space and first ESA astronaut to stay on the ISS — Soyuz TM-22, STS-121/116
  Vladimír Remek (Intercosmos), first Czech and first non-Soviet European in space — Soyuz 28
  Hans Schlegel, EAC — STS-55, STS-122
  Helen Sharman, first Briton in space — Soyuz TM-12/11
  Mark Shuttleworth, second "space tourist" and first South African in space — Soyuz TM-34/33
  Gerhard Thiele, EAC — STS-99
  Michel Tognini, EAC — Soyuz TM-15/14, STS-93
  Franz Viehböck, first Austrian in space — Soyuz TM-13/12
  Roberto Vittori, EAC — Soyuz TM-34/33, Soyuz TMA-6/5
  Ulrich Walter — STS-55

Resident Outside Europe
Other European astronauts now residing or holding citizenship outside Europe include:

 Michael Foale, born in Louth, England, dual British and American citizen.
 Nicholas Patrick, born in Saltburn-by-the-Sea, England.
 Piers Sellers, born in Crowborough, England.
 Charles Simonyi, born in Budapest, Hungary. Fifth space tourist.
 Lodewijk van den Berg, born in Sluiskil, Netherlands.

See also
 List of Soviet human spaceflight missions
 List of Russian human spaceflight missions
 List of space travelers by nationality

European